, or  for short, is a 2011 Japanese live-action film directed by Makoto Tanaka which was released in Japanese cinemas on 4 June 2011. It is based on the bestselling book of the same name and followed a preceding anime series also of the same name.

Story
The movie is about Minami Kawashima (played by Atsuko Maeda), a high school girl who becomes the manager of her school's baseball team in place of her hospitalized friend, Yuki Miyata (Haruna Kawaguchi). She tries to lead the team to the National High School Baseball Championship by learning strategies from the business book Management: Tasks, Responsibilities, Practices by Peter Drucker, which she mistakenly bought.

Cast
 Hiroshi Oizumi as the manager
 Hiroki Suzuki as Masayoshi Nikai
 Yukito Nishii as Yunosuke Sakurai

Filming

Development
Moshidora was first announced on 13 December 2010, together with the main cast. The main character would be played by Atsuko Maeda in her first lead film role. Although the book was modeled on her fellow AKB48 member Minami Minegishi, Atsuko Maeda was chosen because she had more acting experience. Minami Minegishi will also star in the film as a supporting character.

Music
Moshidora'''s theme song was announced to be the song "Everyday, Kachūsha", sung by idol group AKB48. The lyrics of this song was written by Yasushi Akimoto, and the music was composed by Yoshimasa Inoue.

Release
Box officeMoshidora was first released in Japanese cinemas on 4 June 2011. It debuted in the 4th position at the Japanese box office with a total gross of US$2,232,675 in its debut weekend.

Soundtrack disc

The original soundtrack for the film Moshidora was released on 1 June 2011 by Sony Music Entertainment Japan.

Merchandise
Official visual book
An official visual book of the Moshidora'' film was released on 28 May 2011. It contains photographs of the making of the film.

References

External links
  
 

2011 films
2010s sports comedy-drama films
Japanese comedy-drama films
Films based on Japanese novels
Mass media franchises
Moshidora
Toho films
AKB48
Japanese baseball films
2011 comedy films
2011 drama films
Films scored by Takayuki Hattori
2010s Japanese films

ja:もし高校野球の女子マネージャーがドラッカーの『マネジメント』を読んだら#映画